The 1916 Stanley Cup Finals was played between the National Hockey Association (NHA) champion Montreal Canadiens and the Pacific Coast Hockey Association (PCHA) champion Portland Rosebuds. This was the first time that a best-of-five Cup championship went the distance. Also, the Rosebuds were the first team based in the United States to play for the Cup. The Canadiens defeated the Rosebuds three games to two in the best-of-five-game series. This was the Canadiens' first Stanley Cup championship.

Paths to the Finals
Montreal won the NHA title after finishing the 1915–16 regular season in first place with a 16–7–1 record. Meanwhile, Portland clinched the 1915–16 PCHA title with a 13–5 record.

Game summaries
The games of the series were played at Montreal's Montreal Arena as it was the turn of the NHA champions to host the series. Games one, three and five were played under NHA rules; Games two and four were played under PCHA rules. Ernie Johnson's share of series revenues was by court order to be paid to the Montreal Wanderers, whom he had left while under contract to go to the PCHA. For the entire series, future Hockey Hall of Fame goaltender Georges Vezina aided Montreal by posting a 2.60 goals-against average. Didier Pitre led the Canadiens in scoring with 4 goals.

Montreal Canadiens NHA champions Roster - Georges Veznia goalie, Howard McNamara (Captain) point, Bert Corbeau cover point, Didier Pitre center-rover, Edouard "Newsy" Lalonde (Playing-Coach) center, George "Goldie" Prodgers right wing-left wing, Jack Laviolettte left wing, Amous Arbour left wing, Louis Berlinguette left wing, Georges "Skinner" Poulin center, Eskene “Skene” Ronan center right wing, spare Jack Fournier right wing-left wing - U.P. Boudier (President), George "Kennedy", Kendall (Manager-owner).

Portland Rosebuds PCAH champions Roster - Tommy Murray goalie, Del Irvine point, Ernie "Moose" Johnson cover point, Fred "Smokey" Harrius rover-left wing, 
Tommy Dunderdale center, Eddie Oatman light wing, Charlies Tobin left wing-right wing, Charlie Uksilla left wing, Alf Barbour center, C.D. Doherty (President), Edward Savage (Manager-Coach).

Game one

Portland arrived by train the day before the game but showed no weariness, recording a shutout despite game one being played under Eastern Rules (6 a side). It was noted that Portland's speedy backchecking limited Montreal to only 6 chances.

Game two

Despite missing Newsy Lalonde (bad cold) and Jack Laviolette (broken jaw), Montreal behind some heavy checking defeated Portland 2–1 to tie the series under Western PCHA rules (7 a side).

Game three

Lalonde and Laviolette played in game three. Lalonde got into a fight with Ernie Johnson, requiring the police to break up the fight. Lalonde and Laviolette were ejected for the game and Eddie Oatman received a major penalty. Pitre was the scoring star, scoring three goals to lead the Canadiens to a 6–3 victory. Eastern rules were used.

Game four

The Rosebuds then evened the series with a 6–5 victory in game four. The Rosebuds took a 3–0 lead, only to see the Canadiens tie it and take a 4–3 lead. In the third period Portland's Fred Harris scored twice and Charlie Uksilla scored once to take a 6–4 lead until the last minute when Lalonde scored to make it closer. Western rules were used.

Game five

In game five, Portland's Tommy Dunderdale gave his team a 1–0 lead before Skene Ronan tied the game. The seldom-used George Prodgers then scored the game and series-winning goal to clinch the Cup for the Canadiens. Eastern rules were used.

Stanley Cup engraving
The 1916 Stanley Cup was presented by the trophy's trustee William Foran. The Canadiens never did engrave their name on the Cup for their championship season.

The following Canadiens players and staff were members of the Stanley Cup winning team.

1915–16 Montreal Canadiens

References

See also
 1915–16 Montreal Canadiens season
 1915–16 NHA season
 1915–16 PCHA season
 List of Stanley Cup champions

Stanley Cup Finals
Stan
Stan
Stan
Stan
Montreal Canadiens games
Stan
March 1916 sports events
Ice hockey competitions in Montreal
1910s in Montreal
1916 in Quebec